John Williamson (23 May 1901 – 1949) was a Scottish mathematician who worked in the fields of algebra, invariant theory, and linear algebra.  Among other contributions, he is known for the Williamson construction of Hadamard matrices.  Williamson graduated from the University of Edinburgh with first-class honours in 1922.  Awarded a Commonwealth Fellowship in 1925, he studied at the University of Chicago under the direction of L. E. Dickson and E. H. Moore, receiving the Ph.D. in 1927.  He held a Lectureship in Mathematics at the University of St Andrews and an Associate Professorship in Mathematics at Johns Hopkins University.

See also 

 Williamson conjecture

References

External links
 
 

1901 births
1949 deaths
Alumni of the University of Edinburgh
Johns Hopkins University faculty
University of Chicago fellows
Academics of the University of St Andrews
Matrices
20th-century Scottish mathematicians